Gabriel José Moreno (born February 14, 2000) is a Venezuelan professional baseball catcher for the Arizona Diamondbacks of Major League Baseball (MLB). He made his MLB debut with the Toronto Blue Jays in 2022.

Professional career

Toronto Blue Jays
Moreno signed with the Toronto Blue Jays as an international free agent on August 3, 2016. Moreno made his professional debut in 2017 with the Rookie-level Dominican Summer League Blue Jays. In 2018, Moreno split the year between the Rookie-level Gulf Coast League Blue Jays and the Rookie Advanced Bluefield Blue Jays, slashing a cumulative .359/.395/.575 with four home runs and 36 RBI. The following year, Moreno played for the Class-A Lansing Lugnuts, hitting .280/.337/.485 with career-highs in home runs (12), RBI (52), stolen bases (7), and walks (22).

Moreno did not play in a game in 2020 due to the cancellation of the minor league season because of the COVID-19 pandemic. The Blue Jays added him to their 40-man roster after the 2020 season.

Moreno was assigned to the Double-A New Hampshire Fisher Cats to begin the 2021 season, where he excelled, batting .373/.441/.651 with eight home runs and 45 RBI in 32 games. On July 3, 2021, Moreno underwent surgery on his right thumb after suffering a fracture. Moreno returned from the injury later in the season and was promoted to the Triple-A Buffalo Bisons. After the season, he played for the Mesa Solar Sox of the Arizona Fall League, where he hit .329 with a home run and 18 RBI in 22 games, as well as 18 games with the Cardenales de Lara of the Venezuelan Winter League.

In March 2022, Moreno participated in spring training with the Blue Jays. He began the 2022 season with Buffalo.

Moreno joined the Blue Jays in Detroit on June 9, 2022, following an injury sustained by catcher Danny Jansen, but was not activated until June 11, when he was added to the day's starting line-up at the catcher position and batting eighth in the order. He was slashing .324/.380/.404 in 36 games with the Bisons prior to his call up.

Moreno earned his first major league hit on June 11, 2022, a single, in his fourth at-bat of the day.

Arizona Diamondbacks
On December 23, 2022, the Blue Jays traded Moreno and Lourdes Gurriel Jr. to the Arizona Diamondbacks in exchange for Daulton Varsho.

References

External links

2000 births
Living people
Major League Baseball players from Venezuela
Major League Baseball catchers
Toronto Blue Jays players
Dominican Summer League Blue Jays players
Gulf Coast Blue Jays players
Bluefield Blue Jays players
Lansing Lugnuts players
Cardenales de Lara players
Florida Complex League Blue Jays players
New Hampshire Fisher Cats players
Buffalo Bisons (minor league) players
Mesa Solar Sox players